Megan Rochell is an American contemporary R&B singer, who was formerly signed to Def Jam Records. After parting ways with the label, she signed a production deal with producer Rodney Jerkins of Darkchild Productions. Rochell also inked a publishing deal with EMI/Blackwood publishing within the same time frame.

Biography
At the age of 11, Rochell was a five-time winner on Showtime at the Apollo. Several years later, she met Philadelphia International's Leon Huff and started working on her recording career. One day outside of Philadelphia International, she met Boyz II Men's Nathan Morris and sang for him which prompted Morris to sign her to his management company. Then Rochell secured herself a deal with Def Jam Records. She was enrolled at Rowan University, originally as a business major, then switching to secondary elementary education before dropping out after getting the record deal with Def Jam.

Rochell's debut album, You, Me and the Radio, featured collaborations from Rodney Jerkins, Ne-Yo, Fabolous, the Underdogs, and Stargate. The album was scheduled for released on June 20, 2006, but was never released. Rochell chalked the industry changing, along with the management at Def Jam, with Jay Z becoming president, Rihanna being the big new artist, and many other new artists they were trying to market.

However, the project leaked in full online shortly after the project's shelving via the promotional CD. The following year, she collaborated with rapper Peedi on the single "Take Me Home."

In 2008, she released Vibe Love Party mixtape and promoted through on her MySpace page. Additionally, she collaborated with Skinny & Scales on the single "We're Gonna Make It" released in 2009.

In 2015, her digital single "Hell Nah" was released on December 28, 2015. It was later re-released on February 4, 2016 through different label distribution.

In 2016, Rochell released a new single called "I'm Busy!" on digital services.  Later that year, she self-released her debut album digitally onto sites such as Apple Music, Spotify and Amazon Music with a slightly altered tracklist and various bonus tracks not originally available on the original album. It received a limited vinyl release in 2018.

In 2017, she released her first EP, Insight independently and discussed she was working on a girls-only mixtape. Additionally, she spent some time as a songwriter for other artists such as  Kehlani, K. Michelle and Keyshia Cole.

In late 2018, she released two digital singles "X" and "Because of Love" ahead of her new EP New Wave Music, which was released on November 22.

Personal life
She has a son named Austin with her husband Sam Crush. She cites Brandy, Lauryn Hill, Mary J. Blige, Aaliyah, Whitney Houston, and Mariah Carey as influences.

Discography

Albums
2006: You, Me and the Radio

Mixtapes
2008: Vibe Love Party

EPs
2017: Insight
2018: New Wave Music

Singles

References

External links 
Megan Rochell Myspace

1985 births
African-American women singer-songwriters
American contemporary R&B singers
American musicians of Puerto Rican descent
Def Jam Recordings artists
Living people
Rowan University alumni
Singers from New York City
21st-century African-American women singers
Singer-songwriters from New York (state)